Kåfjord is a small village in Nordkapp Municipality in Troms og Finnmark county, Norway.  It is located on the Porsanger Peninsula, along the Kåfjorden, an arm off of the main Porsangerfjorden.

Before the construction of the North Cape Tunnel on the European route E69 highway, Kåfjord was the southern terminus of the ferry route between the mainland and the town of Honningsvåg on the island of Magerøya.

References

Nordkapp
Villages in Finnmark
Populated places of Arctic Norway